Podlesí is a municipality in Ústí nad Orlicí District in the Pardubice Region of the Czech Republic. It has about 300 inhabitants.

Administrative parts
The municipality is made up of villages of Němčí, Olešná and Turov.

References

Villages in Ústí nad Orlicí District